Trapezites iacchoides, commonly known as the silver studded ochre or iacchoides skipper, is a species of butterfly in the family Hesperiidae. It is endemic to Australia, where it occurs in New South Wales, Queensland and Victoria. It inhabits cool, temperate, open eucalypt forests.

Description 
From above, the forewings each exhibit a large yellow spot in the cell, two yellow postmedian spots, a yellow median spot near the dorsum, a yellow streak along the dorsum towards the base and a band of three small yellow subapical spots, while the hindwings each exhibit a single large orange-yellow patch. From below, the forewings are an unmarked brown on the lower half of the wing with the upper half exhibiting yellow markings as above, while the hindwings are a brownish-grey with 9 silvery-white spots edged with brown. Adult males and females appear similar. Larvae are pale grey-green to brown with a dark brown head marked with two pale brown spots and two pale median stripes.

Behaviour and life cycle 
Adults fly fast and close to the ground. Under sunny conditions adult males engage in hilltopping. Adult females tend to remain close to their breeding areas, laying their eggs singly on the leaves of the species' host plant, the spiny-headed mat rush (Lomandra longifolia). Once hatched, the larvae construct a vertical shelter from silk and dead leaves near the base of the host plant, resting in their shelter during the day and emerging to feed at night. Larvae overwinter inside their larval shelters. Pupation occurs inside the larval shelter, head pointing upwards. There is a single generation each year, with adults emerging primarily in October and November.

References 

Butterflies of Australia
Insects of Australia
Hesperiidae
Trapezitinae
Butterflies described in 1903